Qaraghandy  Medical University (Qaraǵandy memlekettik meditsina ýniversiteti) - established in 1950, is the leading medical university of Kazakhstan in training of qualified personnel for healthcare system.

Currently, the University implements the multi-level training of specialists: bachelor program, postgraduate (master's course, residency, PhD program) and additional education. Training is provided in Kazakh, Russian and English languages. Over 8 thousand students study at the University.

Structure 
Faculties:
 Faculty of General Medicine and Dentistry
 Faculty of Internship
 Faculty of Preventive Medicine, Biology and Pharmacy
 Faculty of Continuous Professional Development

References

Universities in Kazakhstan
Medical and health organizations based in Kazakhstan
Buildings and structures in Karaganda
Public medical universities